Norfolk station is a train station in Norfolk, Virginia. It is the terminus of a branch of Amtrak's Northeast Regional service which begins in Boston, Massachusetts. Service began on December 12, 2012. This station returned intercity passenger rail service to Norfolk proper for the first time since 1977 when the Mountaineer ended. Norfolk was previously served by several railroads, including Norfolk & Western at Norfolk Terminal Station (demolished 1963), and then by N&W and Amtrak at Lambert's Point station.

The $3.75 million brick and glass depot, financed by the city, opened on December 2, 2013. It was designed by architects and engineers with the Michael Baker Corporation and includes a three-story tower. Prior to the depot's completion, passengers only used the concrete platform.

The station is adjacent to the Harbor Park baseball stadium along the Elizabeth River on the eastern edge of downtown. The Tide Light Rail system has an adjacent station at Harbor Park, allowing for connections from Amtrak to the light rail service. 

An additional daily round trip was added on July 11, 2022, increasing Norfolk service to three weekday round trips and two weekend round trips.

Routes 
Northeast Regional

References

External links

City of Norfolk Amtrak station construction information page
Norfolk Amtrak Station (USA Rail Guide – Train Web)

Transportation in Norfolk, Virginia
Amtrak stations in Virginia
Railway stations in the United States opened in 2012